The 2013 West Indies Tri-Series was a One Day International cricket tournament in the Caribbean that was held between India, Sri Lanka and the West Indies. The first round of group fixtures were held at Sabina Park, Kingston, Jamaica with the second round and the final held at Queen's Park Oval, Port of Spain, Trinidad. The series was named the Celkon Mobile Cup. India won the series after they defeated Sri Lanka in the final. Sri Lanka's Upul Tharanga scored the most runs in the series (223), while his teammate Rangana Herath and India's Bhuvneshwar Kumar picked the most wickets with 10; the latter was named the player of the series.

Squads

Matches

Group stage

Points table

Round 1

Round 2

Final

Statistics

Batting
Most runs

Bowling
Most wickets

Broadcasting rights

References

External links
 Tournament home at ESPN Cricinfo

West Indies Tri-Series
West Indies Tri-Series
West Indies Tri-Series
West Indies Tri-Series
Indian cricket tours of the West Indies
Sri Lankan cricket tours of the West Indies